The British Consulate General Hong Kong is the sole governmental agency currently tasked with offering professional formal English-to-Cantonese name translation services to British officials. No similar services are offered by UK diplomatic missions within the Greater China area. It is a long tradition for the UK government to provide such uniform translation for certain cabinet members and other officials. This practice has its origin in the distasteful translation of the name of the 16th Colonial Governor of Hong Kong, and the UK government keeps this tradition alive even after the transfer of Hong Kong's sovereignty to China in 1997. The translation process is very refined, and there is a set of principles that they observe to avoid taboo, undesirable, or embarrassing translations as well as making the translated names more relatable, approachable, and agreeable to local Hong Kongers.

These translated names are widely adopted and used by Cantonese media outlets in Hong Kong and Macau as well as their foreign correspondents and bureaus, spreading these names to Cantonese-speaking expatriate communities in Australia, Canada, the UK, the US, and the like.

Background

It was not uncommon for British officials to be given translation of their names in history. Some of these degrading translations have survived into modern times. Both names are still in use today.

However, the first and the third characters of 史 and 士 share the same archaic pronunciation of the character  (sí), meaning “to die”, and more troublesomely, the same pronunciation of the character  (sí), meaning “shit”. Also, Cantonese speakers sometimes call a toilet bowl  (sí taap), being homophones to the first two characters of his newly translated name. Thus, Stubbs's first Cantonese name translation rendered a wide variety of somewhat unpalatable translations and interpretations, like “toilet bowl’s shit”, “shit tower’s death” etc.

Stubbs, as a result, became the very first governor given a formal Cantonese name translation,  or Sī Tòuh Baht. This difference in tones changes a lot in the meanings, given the fact that Cantonese is a tonal language. And at the same time, Stubbs believed having an authentically translated name would create an approachable image and help the colonial government build a closer relationship with ethnically Chinese Hong Kongers and indigenous villagers. A new governmental tradition of English-to-Cantonese name translation for British officials was thus born.

Translation service and methods

Prior to Hong Kong's sovereignty transfer in 1997, it was the joint effort of the Chinese Language Division of the colonial Chief Secretary's Office and the British Trade Commission in Hong Kong to come up with seemly name translations for British officials. It is now the responsibility of the Hong Kong British Consulate-General, and they usually supply the press with a list of translated names when there is a new cabinet.

The early translation method mainly focused on phonetic or homophonic translation of an official's family name. As the system matured, the official's given names started having a role to play. The translation process has become very sophisticated in modern times. Matters that are culturally only significant to local Hong Kongers, especially for the middle-to-upper class, but not so much to foreigners, like aesthetic values of different calligraphic styles of the characters on an East Asian seal or chop, divinatory feng-shui and suan-ming assessment of the character total stroke count, etc. are all part of the translation service. The Consulate-General has revealed a summary of general guidelines that they now follow for the process:

Cantonese and Mandarin translated names
 This practice of providing comprehensive official name translation services has never been extended to Mandarin or to other UK diplomatic missions out of Hong Kong in the Greater China region. As such, places where Mandarin is their official language usually have different Mandarin-translated names for British officials. The Mandarin-translated names do not only differ from their Cantonese counterparts but also among Mandarin-speaking regions.

This is a phonetic translation that preserves the English name structure.

Reception and exceptions

Like in many cultures, Hong Kongers are generally very concerned with having good names for infants and even for adults themselves. A local Cantonese saying captures this concern very well, “，”, meaning “Don’t worry about being born with a bad fate; (had better) most worry about having a wrong name”, which shares some similarities with the more commonly known Latin phrase in the West, nomen est omen. It is, thus, not unusual to hear stories about adults in Hong Kong in their 30s or 40s changing their names after consulting with feng-shui and suan-ming practitioners in the hopes of improving various aspects of their lives. Hong Kong parents of newborns are just as concerned if not more so. 

Against this cultural backdrop, the Cantonese-translated names prepared by the Consulate-General are generally very well received and often praised by the Hong Kong public. In fact, it is not just Hong Kongers who have high regard for these names. Some of them are so well translated that they have earned the admiration of some Mandarin-speaking commentators of Taiwan.

On the other hand, although it is the usual practice that the Consulate-General provides a new cabinet with Cantonese-translated names, individual officials may still turn down such suggestions and opt for Mandarin-translated names instead, and they occasionally do. When this happens, Hong Kong mainstream media usually adopt the Mandarin-translated names, but some members of the Hong Kong public may frown upon these names. Former Prime Minister David Cameron provided one such example.

This name in whole was intended to signify that he had “the will to make the people happy”, but he chose to forgo the offer. It was later reported that he thought not taking up a new Cantonese name would save some hassle for the media in Hong Kong.

However, quite a few of the Hong Kong public held negative views towards his Mandarin-translated name, especially when previous British officials, like Governor Patten, had adopted a new Cantonese-translated name despite having an existing Mandarin-translated name. Some in Hong Kong continued to find Cameron's Mandarin-translated name objectionable up until his resignation in 2016. He was even made fun of having probably been destined to have his premiership cut short because of “having a wrong name”.

Notable exceptions
Here are some British officials who have not taken up their Cantonese-translated names suggested by the Consulate-General:

As a result of the non-adoption of Cantonese name for Boris Johnson, his brother Jo Johnson was named by the Consulate-General as "約翰森", with the brothers sharing the first two character "約翰" (John) to suggest their relation.

List of translated names

British politicians

British judges 
Cantonese names are assigned to British judges serving in Hong Kong judiciary as non-permanent judges in the Court of Final Appeal.

British Consuls General to Hong Kong

Governors of Hong Kong
(Note: Governors denoted with (*) had no official translated Cantonese names; Governors denoted with (#) referred to acting governors after Japanese occupation)

References

Hong Kong
Hong Kong and the Commonwealth of Nations
Translation
Applied linguistics
Cantonese language
Onomastics